Animal science is a branch of agriculture focusing on animals used by humans.

Animal science may also refer to:

Animal Science (journal), associated with the British Society of Animal Science
Animal Science Journal, associated with the Japanese Society of Animal Science
Journal of Animal Science, associated with the American Society of Animal Science
Animal Science (later Xploration Animal Science), an American television show that was part of the Xploration Station programming block

See also
Animal (journal)
Zoology (disambiguation)
Animal studies (disambiguation)